Worth Township is a township in Butler County, Pennsylvania, United States. The population was 1,416 at the 2010 census.

Geography
Worth Township is located in northwestern Butler County, along its border with Lawrence County. It includes the unincorporated communities of Jacksville and Moores Corners. Interstate 79 runs north–south through the township, with access from Exit 105 (Pennsylvania Route 108) in the north and Exit 99 (U.S. Route 422) just south of the township border. Slippery Rock Creek flows through the northern corner of the township, and Muddy Creek forms the township's southern boundary. The creek is impounded to form Lake Arthur, which is surrounded by Moraine State Park, a recreational area.

Demographics

As of the census of 2000, there were 1,331 people, 473 households, and 377 families residing in the township.  The population density was 54.9 people per square mile (21.2/km2).  There were 543 housing units at an average density of 22.4/sq mi (8.6/km2).  The racial makeup of the township was 98.27% White, 0.53% Asian, 0.38% from other races, and 0.83% from two or more races. Hispanic or Latino of any race were 0.53% of the population.

There were 473 households, out of which 38.3% had children under the age of 18 living with them, 70.4% were married couples living together, 7.0% had a female householder with no husband present, and 20.1% were non-families. 16.5% of all households were made up of individuals, and 5.9% had someone living alone who was 65 years of age or older.  The average household size was 2.79 and the average family size was 3.16.

In the township the population was spread out, with 26.6% under the age of 18, 7.0% from 18 to 24, 31.3% from 25 to 44, 24.7% from 45 to 64, and 10.4% who were 65 years of age or older.  The median age was 38 years. For every 100 females there were 94.6 males.  For every 100 females age 18 and over, there were 99.0 males.

The median income for a household in the township was $40,724, and the median income for a family was $47,891. Males had a median income of $35,417 versus $23,864 for females. The per capita income for the township was $17,324.  About 6.0% of families and 9.7% of the population were below the poverty line, including 12.5% of those under age 18 and 8.8% of those age 65 or over.

Culture
Coopers Lake Campground in the township is the site of the annual Pennsic War, a medieval camping event.

References

External links

Township website

Populated places established in 1790
Townships in Butler County, Pennsylvania